Roknabad (also Romanized as Roknābād; also known as Qal‘eh Now, Rokhābād, and SehMazra‘eh) is a village in Zirkuh Rural District, Bagh-e Bahadoran District, Lenjan County, Isfahan Province, Iran. At the 2006 census, its population was 599, in 177 families.

References 

Populated places in Lenjan County